Epuraea is a genus of sap-feeding beetles in the family Nitidulidae, first described in 1843 by Wilhelm Ferdinand Erichson. There are at least 40 described species in Epuraea. Their most notable food source is sap but these beetles also feed on organic matter such as fruits, flowers, fungi, decaying plant tissue, and the tissue of dead animals.  Epuraea beetles commonly overwinter underneath logs or in soil.

See also
 List of Epuraea species

References

 Habeck, Dale H. / Arnett, Ross H. Jr., Michael C. Thomas, Paul E. Skelley, and J. H. Frank, eds. (2002). "Family 77. Nitidulidae Latreille 1802". American Beetles, vol. 2: Polyphaga: Scarabaeoidea through Curculionoidea, 311–315.
 Parsons, Carl T. (1943). "A revision of Nearctic Nitidulidae (Coleoptera)". Bulletin of the Museum of Comparative Zoology, vol. 92, no. 3, 121–278.

Further reading

 Arnett, R. H. Jr., M. C. Thomas, P. E. Skelley and J. H. Frank. (eds.). (21 June 2002). American Beetles, Volume II: Polyphaga: Scarabaeoidea through Curculionoidea. CRC Press LLC, Boca Raton, Florida .
 
 Richard E. White. (1983). Peterson Field Guides: Beetles. Houghton Mifflin Company.

External links
Epuraea: images & occurrence data from GBIF
 NCBI Taxonomy Browser, Epuraea

Nitidulidae
Cucujoidea genera
Animals described in 1843
Taxa named by Wilhelm Ferdinand Erichson